This is a list of defunct newspapers of Norway.

 Arbeider-Avisa
 Arbeideren
 Bergens Adressecontoirs Efterretninger
 Bergens Aftenblad
 Bergens Social-Demokrat
 Bergens Stiftstidende
 Bergensposten
 Buskerud Blad
 Deutsche Zeitung in Norwegen
 Egersundsposten
 Flekkefjords Budstikke
 Folketanken
 Folketidende
 Folkets Framtid
 Follo
 Fosna-Arbeideren
 Fronten
 Grømstad-Posten
 Hardanger Arbeiderblad
 Haugaland Arbeiderblad
 Haugesunds Social-Demokrat
 Impressionisten
 Karmøens Tidende
 Karmøy-Posten
 Karmsundsposten
 Klassekampen
 Kopervik Tidende
 Kringsjaa
 Kristiansands Stiftsavis og Adressekontors-Efterretninger
 Lillesands Tidende
 Lister
 Lister og Mandals Amtstidende
 Lokalposten
 Magazinet
 Moss Arbeiderblad
 Muitalægje
 Nedenes Amts Landbotidende
 Norges Kommunistblad
 Norsk Landboeblad
 Norsk-Tysk Tidsskrift
 NS Månedshefte
 Ny Tid (Oslo)
 Ny Tid (Trondheim)
 Odda Nyhetsblad
 Orientering
 Østfold-Posten
 Øvre Smaalenene
 Rogaland
 Saǥai Muittalægje
 Samleren
 Sarpen
 Skiens Ugeblad
 Skiensposten
 Solungen
 Søndenfjeldske Avis
 Sportsmanden
 Stavanger Avis
 Stavanger Socialdemokrat
 Trondheims-Pressen
 Tvedestrand og Omegns Avis
 Verdens Gang (1868–1923)
 Vestkysten
 Vestlands-Posten

Newspapers, defunct
Norway, defunct
Norway